V. S. Narasimhan (born 1943) is an Indian violinist and composer who works in South Indian films.

Life 
Narasimhan is the son of the violinist Gottuvadyam Srinivasa Iyengar. He studied Carnatic music from age four under his father. Narasimhan also learnt Western classical music and entered Tamil cinema as a violinist, playing for all leading composers except G. Ramanathan. He even briefly tutored under Master Dhanraj. Narasimhan debuted as a composer with Achamillai Achamillai (1984), and also contributed to Ilaiyaraaja's studio album How to Name It?. In 1993, he founded the Madras String Quartet. In 2010, Narasimhan was awarded the Gotuvadyam Narayana Iyengar Award for Excellence.

Filmography

References

External links 
 

1943 births
20th-century violinists
Carnatic violinists
Indian film score composers
Indian violinists
Tamil film score composers